Piantadino is a 1950 Argentine Spanish language comedy film directed by Francisco Múgica.
The film is based on the cartoon character of the same name created by Adolfo Mazzone.

Comic strip character

Piantadino was a classic comic strip character created by one of Argentina's most notable comics artists and humorists, Adolfo Mazzone. 
Piantadino was Mazzone's best known character. 
The name Piantadino is a diminutive of "Piantado", which means mentally disturbed person, half-mad or, a person who escapes, whether that be physically or just from a situation.

First appearing in the newspaper El Mundo in 1941, Piantadino, the daily comic strip, followed the adventures of a convict who behaved in jail as if he were on a pension. With the characters Afanancio and Barili, the three formed a sympathetic trio of scoundrels. The character subsequently appeared in Guillermo Divito's magazine Rico Tipo. 
Piantadino was adapted for cinema in 1950. 
In the 1970s and 1980s, the comic strip was re-published as a comic magazine.

Film production

Piantadino was made into a film by Emelco-Cinematográfica Interamericana.
The script was written by Carlos A. Petit and Rodolfo Sciamarella, and the film was directed by Francisco Mugica.
It was filmed in black-and-white.
The elusive convict was played by Pepe Iglesias, known for his title role in El Zorro pierde el pelo.  
Other stars were Norma Giménez, Juan José Porta and Rodolfo Onetto.
Carlos Fioriti played Afanancio and Rafael Diserio played Batilio.
The film premiered at the Ocean cinema on March 24, 1950.

Film plot

While working for an insurance company, the title character, Piantadino, a shy man, is selected by sly characters to insure some things that they will later make disappear. Though Piantadino lacks courage, he nonetheless uncovers the fraudulent activity, making a positive impression on his fiancée's father.

Cast
Pepe Iglesias as Piantadino
Norma Giménez 			
Juan José Porta		
Carlos Fioriti 		
Rodolfo Onetto 		
Arturo Arcari 			
Gregorio Barrios 			
Max Citelli 			
Rafael Diserio 		
Cirilo Etulain 	 		
José Maurer 	
Enrique Vico Carré

References

External links

1950 films
1950s Spanish-language films
Argentine black-and-white films
Films based on Argentine comics
Films directed by Francisco Múgica
Live-action films based on comics
Argentine comedy films
1950 comedy films